Cristian Bucchi (born 30 May 1977) is an Italian football manager and former player who was most recently the head coach of Serie B club Ascoli. A forward, he was best known for his goal-scoring ability in Serie B during the peak of his career.

Club career

Early career
Bucchi started his career with the Serie D outfit Sambenedettese in 1995 as an 18-year-old. He made 28 appearances in his first proper season, although he scored no goals.

The Serie D outfit released him at the end of the season, and he took the decision to drop down two divisions to the amateur regional leagues (Promozione Marche). From 1996 to 1998, he enjoyed a fine couple of years where he collecting a brilliant 52 goals in 58 games for Settempeda. The club also promoted to 1997–98 Eccellenza Marche. The 21-year-old's promising talent did not go unnoticed and it showed as Serie A outfit Perugia took a very big gamble in some respects for a non-league striker. Soon after that, in a massive change of fortunes for the young forward, he was called up to the Italy U-21's.

Perugia
After his big move to Serie A, he started straight away in his first season for the club as Perugia claimed a mid-table place in the 1998–99 season. He contributed with 5 league goals and it was a surprise he adapted so quickly, considering he was playing amateur football little over a year before. His second season did not go so well after quite an impressive first season.

He played the 1999–00 season on loan to Vicenza, and scored 11 league goals, which helped his team lift the Serie B title, although they made a quick return to Serie B after failure to avoid relegation the following season.

He returned in 2000 and was ready to start afresh. Coming back to the club and seeing the likes of Ahn Jung-Hwan & Fabrizio Miccoli ahead of him in pecking order, lead to a very disappointing second season for Bucchi, after scoring just once in 7 matches for Perugia. He was also suspended in the second half of season due to doping but shorten after appeal, made him available for 2001–02 Serie A. He left the club in October after only 3 appearances.

Bucchi scored 9 goals for newly promoted Serie B side Ternana in 2001–02 Serie B, as the new boys stayed up in their first Serie B season of the 21st century.

Catania, Cagliari and Ancona
In the summer of 2002, he was signed by ambitious newly promoted Serie B Sicilian outfit, Catania. However, things did not work out very well for Bucchi, after finding first-team opportunities hard to come by, with the likes of Czech forward Jaroslav Sedivec, Luis Oliveira & Nassim Mendil all above him in pecking order. He would go on to find the net just twice in thirteen appearances for the Sicilian side. He was allowed to leave in the winter and made the move to Cagliari in the winter of 2002–03. Once again, he would have to wait for his chance, although with the likes of Fabrizio Cammarata, David Suazo and Luigi Beghetto already the first choice strikers, Bucchi would only feature 10 times in his whole Sardinian career, scoring just once.

Bucchi joined Serie A basement boys Ancona in second half of the 2003–04 season, after a very disappointing half-season in Sardinia, in a part exchange deal which would see Roberto Maltagliati go the opposite way. He scored 5 goals in 12 matches, a very impressive statistic for some-one in his shoes. However once again and not for the first time in his career, his team suffered relegation, as this time round, Ancona set an all-time low in Serie A, amassing just 13 points all season long.

Bucchi signed by Ascoli in a co-ownership deal with Chievo in August 2004, although Ascoli would be the club he would play for.

King of Serie B

Ascoli
In 2004–05, Bucchi scored 17 goals for Ascoli (incredibly, he scored a 1/3 of the teams Serie B goal total that season, of 51 goals) and just missed one match. He became the club's top goalscorer; just 3 goals short of Serie B topscorer Gionatha Spinesi. His contribution was a key factor in Ascoli's impressive fourth-placed finish and a place in the seasons play-offs.

Despite Ascoli's play-off defeat to Torino (A 3–1 loss on aggregate), Ascoli, in bizarre circumstances (only 1 of the 3 original promoted teams went up – Genoa demoted to Serie C1, with their involvement in the Serie B match-fixing scandal that season & Torino had to play Serie B football for the following season, due to financial difficulties), gained promotion to Serie A for the first time in more than a decade.
Modena
In the summer of 2005, Ascoli sold their 50% share of Bucchi to Modena.

In 2005–06, Bucchi scored an incredible 29 goals for Modena and in fact, 1 goal shy of contributing exactly half of the team's league goal total (59 goals). Consequently, he became Serie B topscorer that season, just one goal away from levelling Serie B's all-time topscorer, former Italian international striker Luca Toni, bagging 30 goals in 2003–04 for then-champions, Palermo. Bucchi's contribution would vastly help lead Modena to a play-off place, and scored one goal in the away leg against Mantova. Modena in the end lost out to Mantova, although the result on aggregate was 1–1. This meant that both sides' final league position's would come into the equation (Mantova finished higher than Modena in final league table, meaning Mantova would progress to the final).

Napoli and loans
During the 2006 January transfer window, rumours had linked him to S.L. Benfica. After a year with Modena, he was sold to newly promoted, and ambitious Napoli for €4 million. The complicated deal also included Modena sold Tommaso Chiecchi back to Chievo and signed Bucchi outright.

In Naples, he scored 8 goals in 29 games and the club finished as runner-up to win promotion to Serie A. His striking partner Emanuele Calaiò, scored 18.

Siena
A surplus of Napoli in the new season, as Napoli signed Ezequiel Lavezzi and Marcelo Zalayeta, he was moved to Siena on loan in summer 2007.

Bucchi missed Serie A for 3 seasons since played for Ancona in second half of 2003–04 season, but he failed to score any from his 10 appearances for Siena.

Bologna
In January 2008, he was loaned to Bologna as one of their striker Danilevičius asked to leave for more regular start. He scored five goals during his five-month stay at Bologna, participating in the rossoblu'''s successful quest for promotion to the Italian top flight.

Ascoli
In July 2008 he agreed to return to Ascoli in another loan deal.

Cesena (loan)
On 10 July 2009 he was loaned to Cesena. He returned to Napoli at the start of 2010–11 season, and played a few games.

Pescara (loan)
On 4 January 2011, he was loaned to Serie B club Pescara and his contract with Napoli was terminated during 2011–12 season in a mutual consent.

International career
For Italy, he has only represented his country at Under-21 level. During his time in the team (1998–1999), he collected 3 U-21 caps, scoring 1 goal.

Coaching career

Pescara
Bucchi became the head coach of the Primavera (under-19) team of Pescara in 2012. He obtained UEFA A License, the second highest in the category, with the highest score in the class in 2012. In March 2013, Bucchi was promoted as the head coach to their first team following the sacking of previous coach Cristiano Bergodi. The team also hired Bruno Nobili as nominal head coach and de facto as Bucchi's assistant in order to bypass the bureaucratic ban, as UEFA A License was not qualified to coach Serie A and Serie B level but UEFA Pro License qualified. The club also promoted his assistants in the Primavera, Mirko Savini and Ermanno Ciotti to the first team and re-hired Massimo Marini as goalkeeping coach, who left the position along with Giovanni Stroppa in November 2012.

On 10 March 2013, Bucchi debuted as the head coach of the first team of delfini'' in a 2–1 away loss against Atalanta.

Gubbio
On 12 July 2013 Bucchi joined Gubbio as their head coach. He was fired in January 2014. In summer 2014, during unemployed he obtained the UEFA Pro License.

Torres
In January 2015 Bucchi became the head coach of Torres. The team finished as the 11th of 2014–15 Lega Pro. However, the club later doomed to the bottom due to a match fixing scandal for the matches in the first half of 2014–15 season.

Maceratese
Bucchi was the head coach of Maceratese in 2015–16 Lega Pro season. The team finished as the losing side of the promotion playoffs.

Perugia
On 15 June 2016 Bucchi was hired as the head coach of Serie B club Perugia.

Sassuolo
On 20 June 2017, Bucchi was signed by Sassuolo, replacing Roma bounded head coach Eusebio Di Francesco. On 27 November 2017, Bucchi was sacked.

Benevento
On 6 July 2018, Bucchi was appointed manager of Benevento.

Empoli
On 18 June 2019, Bucchi was appointed manager of Empoli. He was dismissed on 12 November 2019 after the team only gained 3 draws in 6 preceding league games.

Triestina
On 6 July 2021, Bucchi was hired as head coach of Triestina in Serie C. He guided Triestina to fifth place, then being eliminated by eventual winners Palermo in the promotion playoffs.

Ascoli
On 14 June 2022, Bucchi was announced as the new head coach of Serie B club Ascoli, a former club of his as a player. He was sacked on 4 February 2023 following a negative string of results.

Managerial statistics

References

External links
 

1977 births
Living people
Italian footballers
A.C. Perugia Calcio players
L.R. Vicenza players
Ternana Calcio players
Catania S.S.D. players
Cagliari Calcio players
A.C. Ancona players
Ascoli Calcio 1898 F.C. players
Modena F.C. players
S.S.C. Napoli players
A.S. Sambenedettese players
Bologna F.C. 1909 players
A.C.N. Siena 1904 players
A.C. Cesena players
Delfino Pescara 1936 players
Serie A players
Serie B players
Serie D players
Italy under-21 international footballers
Association football forwards
Italian football managers
Delfino Pescara 1936 managers
U.S. Sassuolo Calcio managers
Benevento Calcio managers
Empoli F.C. managers
U.S. Triestina Calcio 1918 managers
Ascoli Calcio 1898 F.C. managers
Serie A managers
Serie B managers
Serie C managers
Footballers from Rome